The Shire of Coomera was a local government area in South East Queensland, Australia. The shire, administered from Coomera, existed as a local government entity from 1879 until 1949.

History

On 11 November 1879, the Coomera Division was created as one of 74 divisions within Queensland under the Divisional Boards Act 1879 with a population of 642.

On 6 July 1883, Southport Division was formed from part of subdivision No. 1 of Nerang Division and part of subdivision No. 1 of Coomera Division.

On 18 January 1884, there was an adjustment of boundaries between subdivision No. 1 of Tabragalba Division and subdivision No.2 of the Coomera Division.

With the passage of the Local Authorities Act 1902, the Coomera Division became the Shire of Coomera on 31 March 1903.

Amalgamations in 1948
On 9 December 1948, as part of a major reorganisation of local government in South East Queensland, an Order in Council replacing ten former local government areas between the City of Brisbane and the New South Wales border with only four. The former ten were:
 Beaudesert
 Beenleigh
 Cleveland
 Coolangatta
 Coomera
 Nerang
 Southport
 Tamborine
 Tingalpa
 Waterford

The four resulting local government areas were:
 the new Shire of Albert: a merger of Beenleigh, Coomera, Nerang (except for the Burleigh Heads area), the southern part of Tingalpa and the eastern part of Waterford
 an enlarged Shire of Beaudesert, an amalgamation of Beaudesert and Tamborine with the western part of Waterford
 Town of South Coast, an amalgamation of the Towns of Southport and Coolangatta with the Burleigh Heads part of Nerang (which later became City of Gold Coast)
 the new Redland Shire, an amalgamation of Cleveland and the northern part of Tingalpa (which later became Redland City)

The Order came into effect on 10 June 1949, when the first elections were held.

Chairmen

References

External links
 

Former local government areas of Queensland
1879 establishments in Australia
1949 disestablishments in Australia